Salih Saeed Ba-Amer (born 1946) is a Yemeni short story writer. He was born in Hadhramaut province. His story Dancing by the Light of the Moon has been translated into English and was included in a 1988 anthology of modern Arabian literature (edited by Salma Khadra Jayyusi).

References

Yemeni writers
1946 births
Living people
Date of birth missing (living people)